Banzai Tameike Dam is an earthen dam located in Saga Prefecture in Japan. The dam is used for agriculture. The catchment area of the dam is 0.6 km2. The dam impounds about 2  ha of land when full and can store 113 thousand cubic meters of water. The construction of the dam was completed in 1973.

References

Dams in Saga Prefecture
1973 establishments in Japan